is a 2011 Japanese drama film directed by Masato Harada based on a novel by Yasushi Inoue.

Cast 
Kōji Yakusho - Kosaku
Kirin Kiki - Yae
Aoi Miyazaki - Kotoko
Kaho Minami - Kuwako
Erina Mano - Sadayo
Takahiro Miura - Segawa
Rentarō Mikuni - Hayato

Awards
Cinematographer Akiko Ashizawa won the award for best cinematography for her work on the film at the Mainichi Film Awards.

References

External links 

2011 drama films
2011 films
Films directed by Masato Harada
Japanese drama films
2010s Japanese films